The 2014 Penn State Nittany Lions men's soccer team was the college's 104th season of playing organized men's college soccer. The Nittany Lions entered the season as the defending Big Ten regular season champions

Background 
Penn State began the 2014 season as the two time defending regular season champions. They also lost in the semifinal of the Big Ten Tournament to Indiana, and lost in the third round of the NCAA Tournament to New Mexico.

Roster

Competitions

Regular season

Big Ten Standings

Match results

Big Ten Tournament

NCAA Tournament

Statistics

Transfers

Recruits

Out

See also 
2014 Big Ten Conference men's soccer season
2014 Big Ten Conference Men's Soccer Tournament
2014 NCAA Division I Men's Soccer Championship

References 

Penn State Nittany Lions
Penn State Nittany Lions
Penn State Nittany Lions men's soccer seasons
Penn State Nittany Lions